Ksenia Vladimirovna Sukhinova (born 26 August 1987) is a Russian model, television host and beauty queen who was crowned Miss World 2008. She was the second Russian woman to be crowned Miss World, and had previously been crowned Miss Russia 2007.

Personal life
Sukhinova was born 1987 in Nizhnevartovsk, Russian SFSR. She was an only child. She lives in Moscow, Russia, and attends Tyumen State Oil and Gas University, studying cybernetic systems.

Sukhinova's height is 1.78 m (5'10") and she has blonde hair and blue eyes. Her first name is often romanized Ksenya or Kseniya. She is a fan of sports, and has been doing calisthenics, swimming and biathlon since childhood. Her favorite book is The Master and Margarita by Mikhail Bulgakov. When asked a question about her private life, she said that her heart was "still free."

In 2022, her baby boy, Artem, was born. That same year, she opposed the Russian invasion of Ukraine. She currently lives in France.

Miss Tyumen
Before Ksenia Sukhinova become Miss Russia 2007 and Miss World 2008, she was entered in Miss Tyumen and won the title and make her as the new Miss Tyumen that time to become representative in Miss Russia 2007.

Miss Russia 2007
Sukhinova won the 2007 Miss Russia pageant on 14 December 2007 in Moscow, where she represented Tyumen. She surpassed 50 other contestants from all over Russia. She was unable to represent Russia at Miss Universe 2008 due to her college work, so her 2nd runner-up, Vera Krasova, replaced her in the pageant. Vera placed as the 3rd runner-up to Venezuela's Dayana Mendoza.

Miss World 2008
On 13 December 2008, Sukhinova was crowned the new Miss World at the finals in Johannesburg, South Africa after beating 108 contestants. 

In a press conference after her victory, she said: "I am very glad to have brought this crown to Russia. I am proud that it is Russia that got the crown and I devote my victory to the whole country and to its every citizen... and to my grandmother." She also said that she hoped to improve Russia's international image to show the world that a girl from Russia could personify kindness, beauty and happiness.

References

External links

Ksenia Sukhinova Miss World 2008 Official Website

1987 births
Living people
People from Nizhnevartovsk
Miss Russia winners
Miss World winners
Miss World 2008 delegates
Russian beauty pageant winners
Russian activists against the 2022 Russian invasion of Ukraine